Panola is an unincorporated community in Iron County, in the U.S. state of Michigan.

History
Panola is derived from a Native American word meaning "cotton".

References

Unincorporated communities in Iron County, Michigan